The 1989 Galician regional election was held on Sunday, 17 December 1989, to elect the 3rd Parliament of the autonomous community of Galicia. All 75 seats in the Parliament were up for election.

Overview

Electoral system
The Parliament of Galicia was the devolved, unicameral legislature of the autonomous community of Galicia, having legislative power in regional matters as defined by the Spanish Constitution of 1978 and the regional Statute of Autonomy, as well as the ability to vote confidence in or withdraw it from a regional president.

Voting for the Parliament was on the basis of universal suffrage, which comprised all nationals over 18 years of age, registered in Galicia and in full enjoyment of their political rights. The 75 members of the Parliament of Galicia were elected using the D'Hondt method and a closed list proportional representation, with an electoral threshold of three percent of valid votes—which included blank ballots—being applied in each constituency. Parties not reaching the threshold were not taken into consideration for seat distribution. Seats were allocated to constituencies, corresponding to the provinces of La Coruña, Lugo, Orense and Pontevedra, with each being allocated an initial minimum of 10 seats and the remaining 35 being distributed in proportion to their populations.

The use of the D'Hondt method might result in a higher effective threshold, depending on the district magnitude.

The electoral law allowed for parties and federations registered in the interior ministry, coalitions and groupings of electors to present lists of candidates. Parties and federations intending to form a coalition ahead of an election were required to inform the relevant Electoral Commission within ten days of the election call, whereas groupings of electors needed to secure the signature of at least one percent of the electorate in the constituencies for which they sought election, disallowing electors from signing for more than one list of candidates.

Election date
The term of the Parliament of Galicia expired four years after the date of its previous election, unless it was dissolved earlier. The election decree was required to be issued no later than the twenty-fifth day prior to the date of expiry of parliament and published on the following day in the Official Journal of Galicia (DOG), with election day taking place between the fifty-fourth and the sixtieth day from publication. The previous election was held on 24 November 1985, which meant that the legislature's term would have expired on 24 November 1989. The election decree was required to be published in the DOG no later than 31 October 1989, with the election taking place up to the sixtieth day from publication, setting the latest possible election date for the Parliament on Saturday, 30 December 1989.

After legal amendments in 1988, the president was granted the prerogative to dissolve the Parliament of Galicia and call a snap election, provided that it did not occur before one year had elapsed since a previous dissolution under this procedure. In the event of an investiture process failing to elect a regional president within a two-month period from the first ballot, the Parliament was to be automatically dissolved and a fresh election called.

Opinion polls
The table below lists voting intention estimates in reverse chronological order, showing the most recent first and using the dates when the survey fieldwork was done, as opposed to the date of publication. Where the fieldwork dates are unknown, the date of publication is given instead. The highest percentage figure in each polling survey is displayed with its background shaded in the leading party's colour. If a tie ensues, this is applied to the figures with the highest percentages. The "Lead" column on the right shows the percentage-point difference between the parties with the highest percentages in a poll. When available, seat projections determined by the polling organisations are displayed below (or in place of) the percentages in a smaller font; 38 seats were required for an absolute majority in the Parliament of Galicia (36 until 24 November 1985).

Results

Overall

Distribution by constituency

Aftermath

Notes

References
Opinion poll sources

Other

1989 in Galicia (Spain)
Galicia
Regional elections in Galicia (Spain)
December 1989 events in Europe